No Hye-sun (born 23 March 1969) is a South Korean middle-distance runner. She competed in the women's 1500 metres at the 1988 Summer Olympics.

References

1969 births
Living people
Athletes (track and field) at the 1988 Summer Olympics
South Korean female middle-distance runners
Olympic athletes of South Korea
Place of birth missing (living people)